Harpefoss is a village in Sør-Fron Municipality in Innlandet county, Norway. The Dovrebanen railway line runs through the village.

New kindergarten (2010)
The municipal council in Sør-Fron began planning for a restructuring of the local schools in 2009. In December 2010, a decision was made which included one new kindergarten in Harpefoss. Both the deputy mayor and the chair of the living conditions committee, both from the Labour Party, said that the process had not been optimal in that all information that would be necessary for an informed decision had not been gathered.

Farm fire (2010)
On the night before Christmas 2010 a fire at a cattle barn killed between 20 and 30 cows.

References

Sør-Fron
Villages in Innlandet
Populated places on the Gudbrandsdalslågen